The  is a step through motorcycle, very similar to the Yamaha Mate  and the Honda Super Cub, that was produced by Suzuki from the early 1970s to the early 1980s.

It is started by a kick start mechanism which turns over the engine.

It has a small 6 V battery fitted and an ignition switch to provide easy starting and for constant and even power to the lights and horn.

It is one of the most popular Suzuki models in Malaysia and Africa.

References 

FR80
Two-stroke motorcycles
Motorcycles introduced in the 1970s